Muth may refer to:

 Chuck Muth, former Nevada Republican Party executive director
 Ellen Muth, American actress
 John Muth, American economist
 Jon J. Muth, American comic book artist
 Karl Muth, German commentator
 Peter J. De Muth, U.S. House of Representatives member
 Richard Muth, American urban economist

See also
 Mot (disambiguation)
 Frankenmuth, Michigan, nicknamed "Muth"

Surnames from given names